By the time the Ottoman Empire rose to power in the 14th and 15th centuries, there had been Jewish communities established throughout the region. The Ottoman Empire lasted from the early 14th century until the end of World War I and covered parts of Southeastern Europe, Anatolia, and much of the Middle East. The experience of Jews in the Ottoman Empire is particularly significant because the region "provided a principal place of refuge for Jews driven out of Western Europe by massacres and persecution."

At the time of the Ottoman conquests, Anatolia had already been home to communities of Byzantine Jews. The Ottoman Empire became a safe haven for Iberian Jews fleeing persecution.

The First and Second Aliyah brought an increased Jewish presence to Ottoman Palestine.  The Ottoman successor state of modern Turkey continues to be home to a small Jewish population today.

Overview

At the time of the Battle of Yarmuk when the Levant passed under Muslim Rule, thirty Jewish communities existed in Haifa, Sh’chem, Hebron, Ramleh, Gaza, Jerusalem, as well as many other cities. Safed became a spiritual centre for the Jews and the Shulchan Aruch was compiled there as well as many Kabbalistic texts.

In addition to the already existing Jewish population in the lands the Ottomans conquered, many more Jews were given refuge after the expulsion of Jews from Spain, under the reign of Beyezid II. Although the status of the Jews in the Ottoman Empire may have been exaggerated, it is undeniable that some tolerance was enjoyed. Under the millet system, non-Muslims were organized as autonomous communities on the basis of religion (viz. Orthodox millet, Armenian millet, etc.). In the framework of the millet Jews had a considerable amount of administrative autonomy and were represented by the Hakham Bashi, the Chief Rabbi. There were no restrictions in the professions Jews could practice analogous to those common in Western Christian countries.  There were restrictions, however, regarding the areas Jews could live in or work, which were similar to the restrictions placed on Ottoman subjects of other religions. Like all non-Muslims, Jews had to pay the haraç ("head tax") and faced other restrictions in clothing, horse riding, army service, residence location, slave ownership, etc. However, although many of these restrictions "were decreed [not many of them]...were always enforced"

Some Jews who reached high positions in the Ottoman court and administration include Mehmed II's minister of Finance ("Defterdar") Hekim Yakup Pasa, his Portuguese physician Moses Hamon, Murad II's physician Is'hak Pasha and Abraham de Castro, who was the master of the mint in Egypt.

Classical Ottoman period (1300–1600)

The first Jewish synagogue linked to Ottoman rule is Etz ha-Hayyim (Hebrew: עץ החיים Lit. Tree of Life) in Bursa which passed to Ottoman authority in 1324. The synagogue is still in use, although the modern Jewish population of Bursa has shrunk to about 140 people.

During the Classical Ottoman period, the Jews, together with most other communities of the empire, enjoyed a certain level of prosperity. Compared with other Ottoman subjects, they were the predominant power in commerce and trade as well as diplomacy and other high offices. In the 16th century especially, the Jews rose to prominence under the millets, the apogee of Jewish influence could arguable be the appointment of Joseph Nasi to Sanjak-bey (governor, a rank usually only bestowed upon Muslims) of the island of Naxos. Also in the first half of the 17th century the Jews were distinct in winning Tax farms, Haim Gerber describes it as: "My impression is that no pressure existed, that it was merely performαnce that counted."

An additional problem was the lack of unity among the Jews themselves. They had come to the Ottoman Empire from many lands, bringing with them their own customs and opinions, to which they clung tenaciously, and had founded separate congregations. Another tremendous upheaval was caused when Sabbatai Zevi proclaimed to be the Messiah. He was eventually caught by the Ottoman authorities and when given the choice between death and conversion, he opted for the latter. His remaining disciples converted to Islam too. Their descendants are today known as Donmeh.

Resettlement of the Romaniotes

The first major event in Jewish history under Turkish rule took place after the Empire gained control over Constantinople. After Sultan Mehmed II's Conquest of Constantinople he found the city in a state of disarray. After suffering many sieges, a devastating conquest by Catholic Crusaders in 1204 and even a case of the Black Death in 1347, the city was a shadow of its former glory. As Mehmed wanted the city as his new capital, he decreed the rebuilding of the city. And in order to revivify Constantinople he ordered that Muslims, Christians and Jews from all over his empire be resettled in the new capital. Within months most of the Empire's Romaniote Jews, from the Balkans and Anatolia, were concentrated in Constantinople, where they made up 10% of the city's population. But at the same time the forced resettlement, though not intended as an anti-Jewish measure, was perceived as an "expulsion" by the Jews. Despite this interpretation however, the Romaniotes would be the most influential community in the Empire for several decades, until that position would be lost to a wave of new Jewish arrivals.

Influx of Sephardic Jews from Iberia

The number of native Jews was soon bolstered by small groups of Ashkenazi Jews that immigrated to the Ottoman Empire between 1421 and 1453. Among these new Ashkenazi immigrants was Rabbi Yitzhak Sarfati (Hebrew: צרפתי–Sarfati, meaning: "French"), a German-born Jew whose family had lived in France. He became the Chief Rabbi of Edirne and wrote a letter inviting the European Jewry to settle in the Ottoman Empire, in which he stated "Turkey is a land wherein nothing is lacking" and asked "Is it not better for you to live under Muslims than under Christians?" Many had taken the Rabbi up on his offer, including the Jews who were expelled from the German Duchy of Bavaria by Duke Louis IX in 1470. Even before then, as the Ottomans conquered Anatolia and Greece, they encouraged Jewish immigration from the European lands from which they were expelled. The Ashkenazi Jews mixed with the already large Romaniot (Byzantine) Jewish communities that had become part of the Ottoman Empire as they had conquered lands from the Byzantine Empire.

An influx of Jews into Asia Minor and the Ottoman Empire, occurred during the reign of Mehmed the Conquerors's successor, Beyazid II (1481–1512), after the expulsion of the Jews from Spain and Portugal. The expulsion came about as a result of the Alhambra Decree in 1492, declared by the Spanish King and Queen Ferdinand II and Isabelle I as part of a larger trend of anti-Semitism resurging throughout Europe that the Ottomans would exploit. The Sephardic Jews were allowed to settle in the wealthier cities of the empire, especially in the European provinces (cities such as Istanbul, Sarajevo, Salonica, Adrianople and Nicopolis), Western and Northern Anatolia (Bursa, Aydın, Tokat and Amasya) but also in the Mediterranean coastal regions (such as Jerusalem, Safed, Damascus and Egypt). Izmir was not settled by Spanish Jews until later. The Jewish population at Jerusalem increased from 70 families in 1488 to 1,500 at the beginning of the 16th century, and that of Safed increased from 300 to 2,000 families. Damascus had a Sephardic congregation of 500 families. Istanbul had a Jewish community of 30,000 individuals with 44 synagogues. Bayezid allowed the Jews to live on the banks of the Golden Horn. Egypt, especially Cairo, received a large number of the exiles, who soon outnumbered the pre-existing Musta'arabi Jews. Gradually, the chief centre of the Sephardic Jews became Salonica, where they soon outnumbered the pre-existing Romaniote Jewish community. In fact, the Sephardic Jews eclipsed and absorbed the Romaniot Jews and changed the culture and the structure of Jewish communities in the Ottoman Empire. In the centuries that followed, the Ottomans reaped the benefits of the Jewish communities that they adopted. In exchange for Jews contributing their talents for the benefit of the empire, they would be rewarded well. Compared to European laws, which restricted life for all Jews, that was a significant opportunity, which drew Jews from across the Mediterranean.

The Jews satisfied various needs in the Ottoman Empire. The Muslim population of the Empire was largely uninterested in business enterprises and accordingly left commercial occupations to members of minority religions. Additionally, since the Ottoman Empire was engaged in a military conflict with the Christian nations at the time, Jews were trusted and regarded "as potential allies, diplomats, and spies". There were also Jews that possessed special skills in a wide range of fields that the Ottomans took advantage of, including David and Samuel ibn Nahmias, who established a printing press in 1493. That was then a new technology and accelerated production of literature and documents, which was especially important for religious texts and bureaucratic documents. Other Jewish specialists employed by the empire included physicians and diplomats that emigrated from their homelands. Some of them were granted landed titles for their work, including Joseph Nasi, who was named Duke of Naxos.

Although the Ottomans did not treat Jews differently from other minorities in the country, the policies seemed to align well with Jewish traditions, which allowed communities to flourish. The Jewish people were allowed to establish their own autonomous communities, which included their own schools and courts. Those rights were extremely controversial in other regions in Muslim North Africa and absolutely unrealistic in Europe. The communities would prove to be centers of education and trade because of the large array of connections to other Jewish communities across the Mediterranean.

Banking and finance

In the sixteenth century, the leading financiers in Istanbul were Greeks and Jews.  Many of the Jewish financiers were originally from Iberia and had fled during the period leading up to the expulsion of Jews from Spain.  Many of these families brought great fortunes with them. The most notable of the Jewish banking families in the 16th-century Ottoman Empire was the Marrano banking house of Mendès, which moved to and settled in Istanbul in 1552 under the protection of sultan Suleiman the Magnificent. When Alvaro Mendès arrived in Istanbul in 1588, he is reported to have brought with him 85,000 gold ducats. The Mendès family soon acquired a dominating position in the state finances of the Ottoman Empire and in commerce with Europe.

Taxation
Ottoman Jews were obliged to pay special taxes to the Ottoman authorities. These taxes included the cizye, the ispençe, the haraç, and the rav akçesi ("rabbi tax"). Sometimes, local rulers would also levy taxes for themselves, in addition to the taxes sent to the Sublime Porte.

Textiles

Scholars have proposed that the thriving woolen cloth industry in 16th century Salonica may have contributed to recurring plague outbreaks in the city as Jewish textile workers were exposed to an increased risk of contracting disease in the course of handling wool for the manufacture of woolen broadcloth.

17th century
Friction between Jews and Turks was less common than in the Arab territories. Some examples: In 1660 or 1662, under Mehmet IV (1649–87), the city of Safed, with a substantial Jewish community, was destroyed by Druzes over a struggle for power.

18th and 19th centuries

The history of the Jews in Turkey in the eighteenth and nineteenth centuries is principally a chronicle of decline in influence and power, they lost their influential positions in trade mainly to the Greeks, who were able to "capitalize on their religio-cultural ties with the West and their trading diaspora". An exception to this theme is that of Daniel de Fonseca, who was chief court physician and played a certain political role. He is mentioned by Voltaire, who speaks of him as an acquaintance whom he esteemed highly. Fonseca was involved in negotiations with Charles XII of Sweden.

Ottoman Jews held a variety of views on the role of Jews in the Ottoman Empire, from loyal Ottomanism to Zionism. Emanuel Karasu of Salonika, for example, was a founding member of the Young Turks, and believed that the Jews of the Empire should be Turks first, and Jews second.

Some Jews thrived in Baghdad, performing critical commercial functions such as moneylending and banking.

Prior to the creation of the Yemen Vilayet in 1872, the Zaydi imam of Yemen had implemented more restrictions on Jews than had been present in the Ottoman Empire, such as the Orphans' Decree, which required orphans of Jewish parents to be raised as Muslims. Once Ottoman rule began, the Orphan's Decree was revoked, although a "Dung-Gatherers' Decree," which tasked Jews with cleaning sewers, remained in effect. Also, the Ottoman authorities raised the jizya tax burden on Jews and often did not respect Jewish holidays. Starting around 1881, many Yemeni Jews began to move to Jerusalem.

The Jewish millet agreed upon a constitution which was enacted in 1865, Konstitusyon para la nasyon yisraelita de la Turkia, originally written in Judaeo-Spanish (Ladino). Writer M. Franco stated that Ottoman government employee and translator Yehezkel Gabay (1825-1896) wrote the Ottoman Turkish version of this constitution.

Antisemitism

Historian Martin Gilbert writes that it was in the 19th century that the position of Jews worsened in Muslim countries. According to Mark Cohen in The Oxford Handbook of Jewish Studies, most scholars conclude that Arab anti-Semitism in the modern world arose in the nineteenth century, against the backdrop of conflicting Jewish and Arab nationalism, and was imported into the Arab world primarily by nationalistically minded Christian Arabs (and only subsequently was it "Islamized").

There was a massacre of Jews in Baghdad in 1828. There was a massacre of Jews in Barfurush in 1867.

In 1865, when the equality of all subjects of the Ottoman Empire was proclaimed, Cevdet Pasha, a high-ranking official observed: "whereas in former times, in the Ottoman State, the communities were ranked, with the Muslims first, then the Greeks, then the Armenians, then the Jews, now all of them were put on the same level. Some Greeks objected to this, saying: 'The government has put us together with the Jews. We were content with the supremacy of Islam.'"

Throughout the 1860s, the Jews of Libya were subjected to what Gilbert calls punitive taxation. In 1864, around 500 Jews were killed in Marrakech and Fezin Morocco. In 1869, 18 Jews were killed in Tunis, and an Arab mob looted Jewish homes and stores, and burned synagogues, on Jerba Island. In 1875, 20 Jews were killed by a mob in Demnat, Morocco; elsewhere in Morocco, Jews were attacked and killed in the streets in broad daylight. In 1891, the leading Muslims in Jerusalem asked the Ottoman authorities in Constantinople to prohibit the entry of Jews arriving from Russia. In 1897, synagogues were ransacked and Jews were murdered in Tripolitania.

An important instance of anti-Semitism around this time was the Damascus affair, in which many Jews in Damascus (which was then under the leadership of Muhammad Ali of Egypt) were arrested after being accused of murdering the Christian Father Thomas and his servant in an instance of blood libel. While the authorities   under Sharif Pasha, Egyptian governor of Damascus, tortured the accused until they confessed to the crime, and killed two Jews who refused to confess, prominent European Jews such as Adolphe Crémieux demanded the release of the condemned.

Benny Morris writes that one symbol of Jewish degradation was the phenomenon of stone-throwing at Jews by Muslim children. Morris quotes a 19th-century traveler: 
I have seen a little fellow of six years old, with a troop of fat toddlers of only three and four, teaching [them] to throw stones at a Jew, and one little urchin would, with the greatest coolness, waddle up to the man and literally spit upon his Jewish gaberdine. To all this the Jew is obliged to submit; it would be more than his life was worth to offer to strike a Mohammedan.

The overwhelming majority of the Ottoman Jews lived in the European-provinces of the Empire. As the empire lost control over its European provinces in the late nineteenth and early twentieth centuries, these Jewish communities found themselves under Christian rule. The Bosnian Jews for example came under Austro-Hungarian rule after the occupation of the region in 1878, the independence of Greece, Bulgaria and Serbia further lowered the number of Jews within the borders of the Ottoman Empire.

Jewish life 

In the Ottoman Empire, Jews and Christians were considered dhimmi by the majority Arab population, which translates to "people of the pact". Dhimmi refers to "those to whom the Scriptures were given and who believe not in God nor in the Last Day". Muslims in the Ottoman Empire used this Qur'anic concept of dhimmi to place certain restrictions on Jews living in the region. For example, some of the restrictions placed on Jews in the Ottoman Empire were included, but not limited to, a special tax, a requirement to wear special clothing, and a ban on carrying guns, riding horses, building or repairing places of worship, and having public processions or worships.

Even though Jews were placed under special restrictions in the Ottoman Empire, there was still a vibrant Jewish culture in certain regions of the Empire. This was especially true for the Sephardic Jews, who had large amounts of political and cultural influence in the Ottoman Empire. The Sephardim in the Ottoman Empire had political and cultural influence because they "were perceived as Westerners who had extensive contacts with Europe, who knew European languages, and brought new knowledge and technologies". Additionally, some Sephardic Jews "were...prominent merchants with European markets" who were even regarded as "potential allies, diplomats, and spies" during times of war against Christians. Throughout the 16th century, the Ottoman Empire saw an increased Jewish influence on the economy and commerce. There is no doubt among historians that "Spanish Jews contributed significantly to the development of the capital in the Ottoman Empire in the sixteenth century".

Although many Sephardic Jews had large amounts of political and cultural capital, the Jewish community in the Ottoman Empire was decentralized for most of the region's history. This changed, however, when the Sultan appointed a Hakham-bashi or a chief rabbi to exercise jurisdiction in the community regarding issues of "marriage, divorce, engagement, and inheritance" in addition to delivering "his community's share of the taxes and keeping order" in the community.

Life in Salonica 

Although Jews were spread throughout the Ottoman Empire, the cities of Constantinople and Salonica, also called Thessaloniki, had Jewish populations of about 20,000 Jewish people by the early 16th century. Even though each of these cities had Jewish communities of about 20,000 people, Salonica was considered the main center of Jewish life in the Ottoman Empire. Jewish people maintained a strong presence in Salonica until the outbreak of World War II and the Holocaust, when “there were around 56,000 Jews living in” the city.

Salonica became the Jewish center of the Ottoman Empire after 1492. At this time, the Spanish Inquisition began in Spain and Portugal and Jews were forced to convert to Christianity or emigrate. Religious persecution caused many Sephardic Jews to immigrate to Salonica and make up a majority of the city's population. In Salonica, Jews lived in communities around Synagogues in which, “Jewish organizations provided all the religious, legal, educational and social services”. The concentration of Jews in the city as well as the binding social capital provided by Jewish organizations allowed Salonica to become an “almost autonomous” zone for Jews to flourish in.

The strength of the Jewish community in Salonica can even be seen after the collapse of the Ottoman Empire. After the Ottoman Empire fell, the city of Salonica was not depicted as a Greek or Turkish city, but instead was considered a Jewish city.

Additionally, some historians claim Salonica was seen as the “New Jerusalem” and has been named the “Mother of Israel” where the Jewish Sabbath “was most vigorously observed”. Also, there were many international organizations that thought about creating a new Jewish state instead of Palestine before the state of Israel was created.

Sephardic Jews did not envision Palestine as the seat of Jewish governance and autonomy in the immediate aftermath of World War I. Sa’adi Levy, who lived in Salonica, owned a printing press in Amsterdam that published newspapers in Ladino and French covering the rival ideological claims and intellectual controversies of the day: Ottoman nationalism, Zionism and socialism. The family were merchants and central figures in the textile trade between Salonica and Manchester, England. In 1919, one of his sons proposed Jewish autonomy and self-governance in Salonica to the League of Nations. His daughter Fortunée resettled in England.

Media

During the Ottoman Empire, the following newspapers served Jewish communities:
 Ottoman Turkish with Hebrew characters:
 Ceridei Tercüme ("Translation Journal"), began in 1876 and edited by Jozef Niego, published in Istanbul
 Şarkiye ("The East"), began in 1867, edited by an anonymous person, published in Istanbul
 Zaman ("Time"), began in 1872, edited by an anonymous person, published in Istanbul
 Ottoman Turkish and Ladino (Judeo-Spanish):
 Ceride-i Lisan ("Language Journal"), began in 1899, edited by Avram Leyon
 El Tiempo, a Ladino language newspaper published by David Fresco in Constantinople/Istanbul in the years 1872–1930
 French:
 L'Aurore, published beginning in 1908, by Thessaloniki (Salonika) man Lucien Sciuto; later moved to Cairo
 Le Jeune Turc ("The Young Turk")
 Le Journal d'Orient ("The Journal of the Orient"), 1917–1977, by the political scientist Albert Carasso (Karasu)
 La Nasion ("The Nation"), October 1919 to 17 September 1922, edited by Jak Loria
 Hebrew:
 Hamevasser, 1909–1911, published by Nahum Solokoff

See also
 History of the Jews in Thessaloniki
 History of the Jews in Turkey
 Antisemitism in Turkey
 Racism and discrimination in Turkey
 Romaniotes
 Urfalim
 Hamevasser
 Jews in Palestine under Ottoman rule
 History of the Jews under Muslim rule

References

External links
 Jews, Turks, Ottomans: A Shared History, Fifteenth Through the Twentieth Century
 In particular on the history of Istanbul Jewry in the Ottoman Empire, see M. Rosen, Studies in the History of Istanbul Jewry, 1453-1923 (Diaspora, 2), Turnhout, 2015

Jews and Judaism in the Ottoman Empire
 
Ottoman Empire